Stanley William Farquhar (February 24, 1916 – May 30, 1992) was a politician in Ontario, Canada. He was a Liberal member of the Legislative Assembly of Ontario from 1963 to 1971 who represented the riding of Algoma—Manitoulin.

Background
He was born in Sault Ste. Marie, Ontario, the son of Thomas Farquhar. In 1949, he married Catherine May Reid. He was general manager of Thomas Farquhar and Sons, which produced dairy products and ice cream. Farquhar died at his home on Vancouver Island in 1992.

Politics
Farquhar served on the local school board and was mayor of Little Current.

In 1963, Farquhar ran as the Liberal candidate in the northern Ontario riding of Algoma—Manitoulin. He defeated Progressive Conservative incumbent John Fullerton by 1,644 votes. In 1967 he was re-elected by 1,347 votes. He retired from politics in 1971.

References

External links 

Tributes for Stanley William Farquhar in the Legislative Assembly of Ontario

1916 births
1992 deaths
Mayors of places in Ontario
Ontario Liberal Party MPPs
People from Manitoulin Island
People from Sault Ste. Marie, Ontario